Malawi and Uganda have had diplomatic relations since 1964 at the national level. They have relationships at the regional and multilateral levels as well.

Trade

Trade between Malawi and Uganda remains low.

See also 
 Foreign relations of Malawi
 Foreign relations of Uganda

References

Uganda
Bilateral relations of Uganda
Uganda
Malawi